Dascillidae is a family of beetles within the clade Elateriformia. There are about 100 extant species in 11 genera, which are found worldwide. Dascillidae together with Rhipiceridae form the super family Dascilloidea.

Taxonomy 
The family was named by Guérin Méneville in 1843. The family is divided up into two poorly defined subfamilies Karumiinae, and Dascillinae.

Description 
Adult Dascillidae are 4.5–25 mm long with an elongate body that is somewhat convex in cross-section. They are covered in dense grey/brown hairs. Karumiines have highly modified soft-bodies, similar to some members of Elateroidea.

Ecology 
The adults can be found on grass during the springtime. The larvae occur in moist soil or under rocks. The larvae are thought to feed on roots or decaying plant matter. Some karumiines like Karumia are associated with termites.

Genera
 Anorus 
 Dascillus 
 Karumia 
 Notodascillus 
 Coptocera Murray
 Metallidascillus Pic
 Petalon Schoenherr
 Sinocaulus Fairmaire
 Drilocephalus Pic
 Pleolobus Philippi & Philippi
 Genecerus Walker
 Emmita Escaler
 †Baltodascillus  Baltic Amber, Eocene
 †Cretodascillus  Yixian Formation, China, Early Cretaceous (Aptian)
 †Lyprodascillus  Shanwang, China, Miocene (familial attribution uncertain)
 †Parelateriformius  Daohugou Beds, China, Middle–Late Jurassic

References

Polyphaga
Beetle families